Miguel Samper Agudelo (24 October 1825 – 16 March 1899) was a Colombian lawyer, politician, and writer. In Colombian politics he distinguished himself as a proponent of abolitionism and economic reform, was elected Member of the Chamber of Representatives, and rose to prominence in the Liberal party ultimately being nominated by the Liberal Party as their candidate for the 1898 Colombian presidential election.

Personal life
Miguel was born on 24 October 1825 in Guaduas, Cundinamarca to José María Samper Blanco and María Tomasa Agudelo y Tafur; the eight and youngest of their children. To of his siblings stand out: Agripina, who married Manuel Ancízar Basterra; and José María, who married Soledad Acosta Kemble; all of whom were writers in their own right. On 4 May 1851 Miguel married María Teresa Elena Brush y Domínguez, the American born daughter of an Englishman and his Neogranadine wife. Of this union were born ten children: Manuel Francisco, Santiago, María, José María, Margarita, Antonio, Dolores, Joaquín, Tomás María Canuto, and Francisco Ricardo.

An alumnus of the College of Saint Bartholomew in Bogotá, he graduated Juris Doctor in 1844 and became a Lawyer in 1846.

Selected works

References

Further reading

1825 births
1899 deaths
People from Guaduas
Miguel
19th-century Colombian lawyers
Colombian Liberal Party politicians
Members of the Chamber of Representatives of Colombia
Secretaries of Finance of the United States of Colombia
Candidates for President of Colombia
Colombian abolitionists
Colombian political writers
Colombian economics writers
Colombian columnists
Burials at Central Cemetery of Bogotá
19th-century journalists
Male journalists
19th-century male writers